Oncospermatinae is a palm tree subtribe in the tribe Areceae.

Genera:
Acanthophoenix
Deckenia
Oncosperma
Tectiphiala

References

External links

 
Arecaceae subtribes